Pariabad may refer to:
 Pariabad, Mashhad, Razavi Khorasan Province
 Pariabad, Quchan, Razavi Khorasan Province
 Pariabad, Torbat-e Jam, Razavi Khorasan Province
 Pariabad, South Khorasan